The two 1946 United States Senate elections in California were held concurrently on November 5, 1946. 

After incumbent Republican Senator Hiram Johnson died in office in August 1945, Governor Earl Warren appointed U.S. Army Major and former State Senator William F. Knowland to finish Johnson's term until a successor could be duly elected. Knowland won both the special election to complete Johnson's term, and the regularly-scheduled 1946 election, over former U.S. Representative Will Rogers Jr., both held on November 5.

Republican primary

Candidates
William F. Knowland, incumbent Senator since 1945

Results

Democratic primary

Candidates
John S. Crowder
Adam C. Derkum
Wayne McFarland
Ellis Patterson, U.S. Representative and former Lieutenant Governor of California
Will Rogers Jr., former U.S. Representative from Culver City and son of humorist Will Rogers

Results

General election

Results

Special election
In a simultaneous special election for the remainder of Johnson's term, Knowland won easily. Notably, no candidates were listed on the ballot. Each vote was a write-in, making Knowland technically the first ever write-in candidate elected to the U.S. Senate. In 1954, Strom Thurmond became the first candidate to win a Senate election by write-in where another candidate was actually listed on the ballot.

Results

See also 
 1946 United States Senate elections

References 

1946
California
United States Senate
California 1946
California 1946
United States Senate 1946